is a 2002 Japanese animated adventure short film based on the Digimon franchise created by Akiyoshi Hongo, and the second film for Digimon Tamers series, following Battle of Adventurers (2001). The short film is directed by Tetsuji Nakamura, written by Hiro Masaki, and produced by Toei Animation. The short film was released in Japan on March 2, 2002, as part of Toei Animation Spring 2002 Animation Fair, double featuring with One Piece: Chopper's Kingdom on the Strange Island of Animals film.

In the short film, set after the series finale, Tamers' tries to stop a train Digimon named Locomon on the Real World.

Plot
As Takato and other Tamers' are planning a surprise birthday party for Ruki, a train-Digimon named Locomon wrecks havoc. He and Guilmon tries to stop it, but fails, and Ruki and Renamon gets on it and attempts to stop it. After Takato frees Ruki from mind control spell, they realize that Locomon is being controlled by Parasimon. Takato and Guilmon evolves into Dukemon and destroys Parasimon, but not before sending a signal to start an invasions. Ruki and Jian evolves to SaintGalgomon and Sakuyamon to stop the invasion of Parasimons, but are outnumbered. With determination, Dukemon changes to its "Crimson Mode", and destroys all of Parasimons. Locomon returns to the Digital World, and entire gang attends Ruki's birthday party. She leaves as she is asked to sing her dad's song, and then stares at the sunset.

Voice cast

Production
The short film is directed by Tetsuji Nakamura at Toei Animation, with Hiro Masaki providing the screenplay, and Ken Ueno providing the animation direction for the film. The theme song for the film is titled , sung by AiM.

Release
The short film was released in Japan on March 2, 2002, as part of Toei Animation Spring 2002 Animation Fair, double featuring with One Piece: Chopper's Kingdom on the Strange Island of Animals film. The film premiered on Jetix in the United States on October 2, 2005.

Notes

References

External links

2000s Japanese films
Digimon films
2002 anime films
Toei Animation films
2002 short films
Anime short films
2000s animated short films